Moon-sik, also spelled Moon-shik, Mun-sik, or Mun-shik, is a Korean masculine given name. Its meaning differs based on the hanja used to write each syllable of the name. There are 14 hanja with the reading "moon" and 16 hanja with the reading "sik" on the South Korean government's official list of hanja which may be registered for use in given names.

People with this name include:
Chae Mun-shik (채문식, 1925–2010), Speaker of the National Assembly of South Korea (1983–1985)
Yoon Mun-sik (born 1945), South Korean actor
Lee Moon-sik (born 1967), South Korean actor
Choi Moon-sik (born 1971), South Korean footballer
Kim Moon-shik, represented South Korea in Equestrian at the 1964 Summer Olympics – Individual eventing

Fictional characters with this name include:
Choi Moon-shik, from 2013 South Korean television series Who Are You?

See also
List of Korean given names

References

Korean masculine given names